The Việt Minh (abbreviated from , chữ Nôm and Hán tự: ;) was a national independence coalition formed at Pác Bó by Hồ Chí Minh on 19 May 1941. Also known as the Việt Minh Front, it was created by the Indochinese Communist Party as a national united front to achieve the independence of the Democratic Republic of Vietnam.

The  was previously formed by Hồ Học Lãm in Nanjing, China, at some point between August 1935 and early 1936, when Vietnamese nationalist parties formed an anti-imperialist united front. This organization soon lapsed into inactivity, only to be appropriated by the Indochinese Communist Party (ICP) and Hồ Chí Minh in 1941. They presented the organization as inclusive of political groups, with a founding charter more nationalist than communist. It exhorted “soldiers, workers, peasants, intellectuals, civil servants, merchants, young men and women” to overthrow  “French jackals” and “Japanese fascists, while the group’s first chairman was a non-communist. In all, the Việt Minh established itself as the only organized anti-French and anti-Japanese resistance group. The Việt Minh initially formed to seek independence for Vietnam from the French Empire. The United States supported France. When the Japanese occupation began, the Việt Minh opposed Japan with support from the United States and the Republic of China. After World War II, the Việt Minh opposed the re-occupation of Vietnam by France, resulting in the Indochina War, and later opposed South Vietnam and the United States in the Vietnam War.
The political leader and founder of Việt Minh was Hồ Chí Minh. The military leadership was under the command of Võ Nguyên Giáp. Other founders were Lê Duẩn and Phạm Văn Đồng.

The Việt Nam Độc lập Đồng minh is not to be confused with the Việt Nam Cách mệnh Đồng minh Hội (League for the Vietnamese Revolution, abbreviated as Việt Cách) which was founded by Nguyễn Hải Thần. Việt Cách later joined the Vietnamese National Coalition in 1946.

World War II

During World War II, Japan occupied French Indochina. As well as fighting the French in the battles of Khai Phat and Na Ngan, the Việt Minh started a campaign against the Japanese. For instance, a raid at Tam Dao internment camp in Tonkin on July 19, 1945 saw 500 Viet Minh kill fifty Japanese soldiers and officials, freeing French civilian captives and escorting them to the Chinese border. The Viet Minh also fought the Japanese 21st Division in Thai Nguyen, and regularly raided rice storehouses to alleviate the ongoing famine. 

As of the end of 1944, the Việt Minh claimed a membership of 500,000, of which 200,000 were in Tonkin, 150,000 in Annam, and 150,000 in Cochinchina. After the Japanese coup d'état in French Indochina, the Viet Minh and ICP prolifically expanded their activities.  They formed national salvation associations (cuu quoc hoi) that, in Quang Ngai province alone, enlisted 100,000 peasants by mid-1945. This was backed by the Vanguard Youth (Thanh Nien Tien Phong) in Cochinchina, which expanded to 200,000 by early summer. In the northern provinces of Việt Bắc, their armed forces seized control, after which they distributed lands to the poor, abolished the corvee, established quoc ngu classes, local village militias, and declared universal suffrage and democratic freedoms. 

Due to their opposition to the Japanese, the Việt Minh received funding from the United States, the Soviet Union and the Republic of China. After the August Revolution’s takeover of nationalist organizations and Emperor Bảo Đại's abdication to the Việt Minh, Hồ Chí Minh declared Vietnam's independence by proclaiming the establishment of the Democratic Republic of Vietnam on 2 September 1945.

First Indochina War

Within days, the Chinese Kuomintang (Nationalist) Army arrived in Vietnam to supervise the repatriation of the Imperial Japanese Army. The Democratic Republic of Vietnam therefore existed only in theory and effectively controlled no territory. A few months later, the Chinese, Vietnamese and French came to a three-way understanding. The French gave up certain rights in China, the Việt Minh agreed to the return of the French in exchange for promises of independence within the French Union, and the Chinese agreed to leave. Negotiations between the French and Việt Minh broke down quickly. What followed was nearly ten years of war against France. This was known as the First Indochina War or, to the Vietnamese; "the French War".

The Việt Minh, who were short on modern military knowledge, created a military school in Quảng Ngãi Province in June 1946. More than 400 Vietnamese were trained by Japanese defectors in this school. These soldiers were considered to be students of the Japanese. Later, some of them fought as generals against the United States in the Vietnam War or, to the Vietnamese; "the American War".

French General Jean Étienne Valluy quickly pushed the Việt Minh out of Hanoi. His French infantry with armored units went through Hanoi, fighting small battles against isolated Việt Minh groups. The French encircled the Việt Minh base, Việt Bắc, in 1947, but failed to defeat the Việt Minh forces, and had to retreat soon after. The campaign is now widely considered a Việt Minh victory over the well-equipped French force.

The Việt Minh continued fighting against the French until 1949, when the border of China and Vietnam was linked together as a result of the campaign called Chiến dịch Biên giới ("Borderland Campaign"). The newly communist People's Republic of China gave the Việt Minh both sheltered bases and heavy weapons with which to fight the French. With the additional weapons, the Việt Minh were able to take control over many rural areas of the country. Soon after that, they began to advance towards the French-occupied areas.

North Vietnam and the end of the Việt Minh
Following their defeat at the Battle of Điện Biên Phủ, the French began negotiations to leave Vietnam. As a result of peace accords worked out at the Geneva Conference in Geneva, Switzerland, Vietnam was divided into North Vietnam and South Vietnam at the 17th Parallel as a temporary measure until unifying elections could take place in 1956. Transfer of civil administration of North Vietnam to the Việt Minh was given on 11 October 1954. Hồ Chí Minh was appointed Prime Minister of North Vietnam, which would be run as a socialist state. Ngô Đình Diệm, who was previously appointed Prime Minister of South Vietnam by Emperor Bảo Đại, eventually assumed control of South Vietnam.

The Geneva Accords promised elections in 1956 to determine a national government for a united Vietnam. Neither the United States government nor Ngô Đình Diệm's State of Vietnam signed anything at the 1954 Geneva Conference. With respect to the question of reunification, the non-communist Vietnamese delegation objected strenuously to any division of Vietnam, but lost out when the French accepted the proposal of Việt Minh delegate Phạm Văn Đồng, who proposed that Vietnam eventually be united by elections under the supervision of "local commissions".  The United States countered with what became known as the "American Plan", with the support of South Vietnam and the United Kingdom. It provided for unification elections under the supervision of the United Nations, but was rejected by the Soviet delegation. From his home in France, Vietnamese Emperor Bảo Đại appointed Ngô Đình Diệm as Prime Minister of South Vietnam. With United States support in rigging the referendum of 1955 using secret Central Intelligence Agency (CIA) funding, Diệm removed the Emperor and declared himself the president of the Republic of Vietnam.

The United States believed Ho Chi Minh would win the nationwide election proposed at the Geneva Accords. In a secret memorandum, Director of CIA Allen Dulles acknowledged that "The evidence [shows] that a majority of the people of Vietnam supported the Viet Minh rebels." Diem refused to hold the elections by citing that the South had not signed and were not bound to the Geneva Accords and that it was impossible to hold free elections in the communist North. Vietnam wide elections never happened and Việt Minh cadres in South Vietnam launched an insurgency against the government. North Vietnam also occupied portions of Laos to assist in supplying the insurgents known as the National Liberation Front (Viet Cong) in South Vietnam. The war gradually escalated into the Second Indochina War, more commonly known as the "Vietnam War" in the West and the "American War" in Vietnam.

Khmer Việt Minh
The Khmer Việt Minh were the 3,000 to 5,000 Cambodian communist cadres, left-wing members of the Khmer Issarak movement regrouped in the United Issarak Front after 1950, most of whom lived in exile in North Vietnam after the 1954 Geneva Conference. Khmer Issarak and United Issarak Front were under leadership of Son Ngoc Minh, Tou Samouth, Sieu Heng, etc. It was a derogatory term used by Norodom Sihanouk, dismissing the Cambodian leftists who had been organizing pro-independence agitations in alliance with the Vietnamese. Sihanouk's public criticism and mockery of the Khmer Issarak had the damaging effect of increasing the power of the hardline, anti-Vietnamese, but also anti-monarchist, members of the  Communist Party of Kampuchea (CPK), led by Pol Pot.

The Khmer Issarak and United Issarak Front were instrumental in the foundation of the Cambodian Salvation Front (FUNSK) in 1978. The FUNSK invaded Cambodia along with the Vietnamese Army and overthrew the Democratic Kampuchea Pol Pot state. Many of the Khmer Việt Minh had married Vietnamese women during their long exile in Vietnam.

Laotian Việt Minh
Lao Issara (Free Laos) was a political & military organization of Laotian communists, led by Phetsarath, Souphanouvong, Kaysone Phomvihane, Phoumi Vongvichit. Lao Issara received training and support from Việt Minh. Under French intervention,  Lao Issara was split into non-communists and communists. Laotian non-communists under leadership of Pretsarath later established the Kingdom of Laos which was part of the French Union.

However Laotian communists rejected the French offer and fought side by side with Vietnamese communists during the First Indochina War. In 1950 Lao Issara was renamed to Pathet Lao (Laos Nation) under leadership of Souphanouvong, Kaysone Phomvihane, Phoumi Vongvichit, etc.

See also
Viet Cong
Pathet Lao
Khmer Issarak
History of Vietnam
August Revolution
Communist Party of Vietnam
History of the Communist Party of Vietnam

References

Further reading

External links
 Chương trình Việt Minh
 Mặt trận Việt Minh với cách mạng Việt Nam

 
Vietnamese independence movement
Communism in Vietnam
Defunct political parties in Vietnam
Defunct political party alliances in Asia
History of the Communist Party of Vietnam
Guerrilla organizations
National liberation movements
National liberation armies
Political party alliances in Vietnam
Popular fronts of communist states
Rebellions in Vietnam
World War II resistance movements
Aftermath of World War II in Vietnam
1940s in Vietnam
Organizations established in 1941
1941 establishments in Vietnam
1941 establishments in French Indochina
1950s disestablishments in Vietnam
Political parties established in 1944
Political parties disestablished in 1988
1944 establishments in French Indochina
1944 establishments in Vietnam
1988 disestablishments in Vietnam
1940s in French Indochina
1950s in French Indochina
Communist parties in Vietnam
Ho Chi Minh
Political parties established in 1925
Political parties disestablished in 1930
1925 establishments in French Indochina
1930 disestablishments in French Indochina
1925 establishments in Vietnam
1930 disestablishments in Vietnam
1920s in French Indochina
1920s in Vietnam